William Roy Trumbo (September 17, 1939 – October 28, 2018) was an American college basketball coach and athletics director in the western United States, primarily in California and Hawaii, and coached at the Division I level for three seasons  His first collegiate head coaching position was at Culver–Stockton College in Missouri.

Early years
Born in LaRue County, Kentucky, Trumbo attended Chapman College in Orange, California, and was a two-sport athlete for four years: a forward in basketball and a catcher on the baseball team from 1957 to 1961. He was team captain and student body

Coaching career
Following graduation from Chapman in 1961, Trumbo was an assistant coach at his alma mater for a year, then became the head coach at nearby Garden Grove High School in 1962 for four years. In 1966, he became a college head coach and athletic director at  College, an NAIA program in Canton, Missouri.

Trumbo moved back west to northern California in 1970 to Sonoma State in Rohnert Park as athletic director, and added basketball coaching duties after the Cossacks went  in 1972, winless in a dozen conference games. Under Trumbo, Sonoma State was  overall in 1973 with ten conference wins, and went  the following season. The basketball program was dropped in 1974 for financial reasons and Trumbo departed for nearby Santa Rosa Junior College and was the head coach for nine seasons, posting a  record with seven

Idaho
Moving up to Division I, Trumbo was hired at resurgent Idaho in April 1983, replacing Don Monson, a charismatic alumnus from Coeur d'Alene who departed after five seasons for Oregon in the Pac-10 Conference. The Vandals had been a last place team in the Big Sky Conference for five straight seasons in the late 1970s, but rose to second in 1980 and then won consecutive conference titles (regular season and tournament) in 1981 and 1982.

As an outsider following a hero, Trumbo recognized that his task in Moscow to continue the recent success would be  with less talent and experience, Idaho slipped back into the Big Sky cellar in 1984 and attendance  His teams went  overall ( in conference) and he was relieved of his duties after three seasons in  succeeded by 
an assistant under hall of fame head coach Don Haskins at

Later career
Returning to lower profile programs, Trumbo was later the athletic director at Hawaii–Hilo (1990–2000), Cal State–Monterey Bay (2000–2006), Diablo Valley College (interim,  and back on Hawaii (Big Island) at Konawaena High School from 2009  At Monterey Bay, he was also the basketball coach for his final three 

Trumbo died in Kona at age 79 in 2018 from complications of Alzheimer's disease.

Head coaching record

College

References

External links
 Sports-Reference.com - Bill Trumbo

1939 births
2018 deaths
American men's basketball coaches
Basketball coaches from Kentucky
Basketball players from Kentucky
Chapman Panthers baseball players
Chapman Panthers men's basketball coaches
Chapman Panthers men's basketball players
College men's basketball head coaches in the United States
Culver–Stockton Wildcats men's basketball coaches
High school basketball coaches in the United States
Idaho Vandals men's basketball coaches
Junior college men's basketball coaches in the United States
Sonoma State Seawolves athletic directors
Sonoma State Seawolves men's basketball coaches
American men's basketball players
Forwards (basketball)
People from LaRue County, Kentucky
Deaths from Alzheimer's disease